Elizabeth Scotty (born July 12, 2001) is an American tennis player.

Career
Scotty has a career high WTA singles ranking of 1239 achieved on September 12, 2016.

Scotty made her WTA main draw debut at the 2021 Silicon Valley Classic, where she received a wildcard to the doubles main draw.

Scotty currently plays college tennis at the University of North Carolina at Chapel Hill, where she won the 2021 NCAA doubles championships with partner Makenna Jones.

References

External links
 
 

2001 births
Living people
Sportspeople from Annapolis, Maryland
American female tennis players
North Carolina Tar Heels women's tennis players